Kamiel Callewaert (Zwevegem, 1 January 1866 – Bruges, 6 August 1943) was a Belgian Catholic priest and historian.

Biography 
Kamiel Aloys Callewaert was ordained a priest in 1889. He gained a licenciate in canon law at the Catholic University of Leuven in 1892, a topic he would also teach at this university starting at 1910. In 1894, he became a teacher and a school principal. In the same year, he took on the role of president of Bruges seminary. In 1907, he became a canon regular, and on 6 August 1929 he was appointed an honorary prelate.

Callewaert became a board member of the Association of History of Bruges in 1901, and chairman in 1934. He was also a member of the Provincial Commission for Monuments.

Callewaert was a member of the Pontifical Academy of Theology in Rome, and chairman of the Flemish Federation of Liturgy. He had an innovative approach to liturgy and the study of history. He was also closely involved with the foundation of Blindenzorg Licht en Liefde, an association that aids the blind and the visually impaired.

Publications 
His publications include:
 Jansenius, évêque d'Ypres: ses derniers moments, sa soumission au S. Siège, d'après des documents inédits: étude de critique historique par des membres du Séminaire d'histoire ecclésiastique, établi à l'Université Catholique de Louvain, Leuven, 1893. (A work on the final hours of Cornelius Jansen)
 Les reliques de sainte Godelieve à Ghistelles et leurs authentiques, 1908
 Nouvelles recherches sur la chronologie médiévale en Flandre, Bruges, 1909
 La durée et le caractère du carême ancien dans l'église latine, Bruges, 1913
 Chartes anciennes de l'abbaye de Zonnebeke, Bruges, 1925
 Licht en liefde voor onze blinden, vereeniging tot bescherming van de belangen der blinden (with co-author Maurice Duyvewaardt), Bruges, 1925.
 De origine cantus Gregoriani, Bruges, 1926.
 Caeremoniale in missa privata et solemni aliisque frequentioribus functionibus liturgicis servandum, Bruges, 1928
 Liturgie en eucharistie, Bruges, 1929.
 Over liturgisch mishooren, Den Bosch, 1930
 Ons kerkelijk jaar: ontstaan, indeeling, beteekenis, vruchtbaarheid, Den Bosch, 1932.
 Liturgische beweging: wat ze niet is, wat ze wel is en moet zijn, Den Bosch, 1933.
 Vasten en Voorvasten, Den Bosch, 1933.
 Eucharistisch en liturgisch leven, Bruges, 1936.
 Sacris erudiri: fragmenta liturgica collecta a monachis sancti Petri de Aldenburgo in Steenbrugge ne pereant, Bruges, 1940

Sources 

1866 births
1943 deaths
20th-century Belgian historians
20th-century Belgian Roman Catholic priests
19th-century Belgian Roman Catholic priests
19th-century Belgian historians